is an public aquarium located on the north coast of Notojima in Nanao, Ishikawa Prefecture.

Exhibits

Notojima Aquarium is the only public aquarium in Ishikawa Prefecture that opened in 1982, and is the largest public aquarium facility on the Sea of Japan side. 

The large tank of the "Natural Ecological Museum of the Sea" is one of the largest tanks in Japan for captivity giant kelps (height , width ), and more than 10,000 sardines are captivity. Spotted seals and river otters are also captivity at this facility.

Also aquarium have The 22m tunnel fish tank, dubbed "Dolphins' Paradise" for Pacific white-sided dolphins, Humboldt penguins and fish. In 2010, a project to attach an artificial tail fin to a Pacific white-sided dolphin with a missing caudal fin named Lanan is started. following Fuji at the Okinawa Churaumi Aquarium,  succeeded in installing the second artificial tail fin of a dolphin in the world with the cooperation of Bridgestone.

In 2010, captivity whale sharks in the panoramic fish tank of the new facility "Blue World" is started and aquariums have captivity to this day. also captivity large pelagic fish such as bluefin tuna. In the winter season after 2013, aquariums installed multiple kotatsu in front of the fish tank of "Blue World" and adopted a system to observe fish while warming the body.

Gallery
Exterior

Fish tank

See also
 Notojima
 Notojima, Ishikawa

References

External links
 Official Site 
 Official Site 

Animal theme parks
Aquaria in Japan
Amusement parks in Japan
Amusement parks opened in 1982
Islands of Ishikawa Prefecture 
Tourist attractions in Ishikawa Prefecture
1982 establishments in Japan
Nanao, Ishikawa